Mysore Palace, also known as Amba Vilas Palace, is a historical palace and a royal residence (house). It is located in Mysore, Karnataka. It used to be the official residence of the Wadiyar dynasty and the seat of the Kingdom of Mysore. The palace is in the centre of Mysore, and faces the Chamundi Hills eastward. Mysore is commonly described as the 'City of Palaces', and there are seven palaces including this one. However, the Mysore Palace refers specifically to the one within the new fort.

The land on which the palace now stands was originally known as mysuru (literally, "citadel"). Yaduraya built the first palace inside the Old Fort in the 14th century, which was set ablaze and reconstructed multiple times. The Old Fort was built of wood and thus easily caught fire, while the current fort was built of stone, bricks and wood. The current structure was constructed between 1897 and 1912, after the Old Palace burnt down, the current structure is also known as the New Fort. Mysore Palace is one of the most famous tourist attractions in India, after the Taj Mahal, with more than six million annual visitors.

Engineering and construction 

The last palace, now known as the Old Palace or the Wooden Palace, burned to ashes during a wedding in 1896. Maharaja Krishnaraja Wodeyar IV and his mother Maharani Kempananjammanni Devi commissioned the British architect Henry Irwin to build a new palace. E.W. Fritchley worked as a consulting Engineer.  Meanwhile, the royal family stayed in the nearby Jaganmohan Palace. Construction was overseen by an executive engineer in the Mysore Palace division. He conducted elaborate architectural studies during his visits to Delhi, Madras, and Calcutta, and these were used to plan the new palace. The construction cost was placed at Rs 41,47,913 (around $30 million adjusted to inflation) and the palace was completed in 1912.

The palace was further expanded in around 1930 (including the addition of the present Public Durbar Hall wing) during the reign of Maharaja Jayachamarajendra Wadiyar.

Gallery

See also
 Tipu Sultan
 Krishnaraja Wodeyar IV

References

External links

 Official virtual tour website of Mysore Palace
 Mysore Palace
 Official Mysore Dasara website
 Department of Karnataka Tourism website

Kingdom of Mysore
Palaces in Mysore
Royal residences in India
Tourist attractions in Mysore
Buildings and structures in Mysore
Indo-Saracenic Revival architecture
1912 establishments in India
Houses completed in 1912
Buildings and structures completed in 1912
20th-century architecture in India